The Ngurunta or Runda are believed to have been an indigenous Australian people of the state of South Australia located immediately west of Lake Frome.

Language
A fragmentary list of words ascribed to the Ngurunta people was included in the second volume of Edward Curr's The Australian Race: Its Origins, Languages, Customs (1886-1887). According to Luise Hercus and Peter Austin, however, the vocabulary indicates not a dialect of the Yarli languages, but rather Paakantyi.

People
The number of testimonies surviving concerning the Ngurunta are exiguous, leading to some suspicions that a tribe of this name may not have existed. Norman Tindale inserted them into a territory he had earlier divided up between the Yardliyawara and Wadikali tribes, doing so on the basis of information provided to him by just one informant in the 1960s, and on the fact that Edward Curr's early work had also named such a group.

Country
Ngurunta territory was harsh sandhill country that extended over an estimated  of land from west of the Barrier and Coko Ranges to the eastern edges of Lake Frome, north of the Flinders Ranges. Its southern boundary was marked by Eurinilla Creek. In the north, its boundaries lay around Lake Boolka and Yandama Creek. The Malyangapa were on their eastern boundary.

History
As European colonization strengthened remnants of the Ngurunta are thought to have sought refuge among the Malyangapa.

Some words
 tulta. (kangaroo)
 kalli. (tame dog)

Alternative names
 Runta, Runda

Notes

Citations

Sources

Aboriginal peoples of South Australia